The EAC Invest A/S, formerly known as the Santa Fe Group and East Asiatic Company ( or ØK) is a multinational holding and investment company, based in Copenhagen, Denmark.

History

The East Asiatic Company ( or ØK) was founded by Hans Niels Andersen in Copenhagen in 1897. Service which would eventually include both  passenger and freight lines between the Danish capital, Bangkok and the far east was the initial objective.  Routes to include the Baltic and Black Seas were established when in 1899, the subsidiary Russian East Asiatic Steamship Co. of St. Petersburg was formed.

Europe-Asia operations widened when the firm, Est Asiatique Francais of Paris, followed in 1902, the new Danish West Indian Company, in 1905 and the Siam Steam Navigation Company, in 1908.  The second of these was eventually renamed Thai Navigation Co. after the Thai government took it over in 1941.  For trade in the South of Africa, the Swedish East Asiatic Company later began regular trips.  The subsidiary Russian American Line began sailing to North America in 1916, continuing until 1917.  Another, the Baltic American Line, continued the service under the Danish flag from 1921 to 1930.  EAC was also involved in shipping for hire with tramp operations beginning in 1915 under the subsidiary D/S A/S Orient of Copenhagen.

In 1905, the company purchased Water Island in the Caribbean from the Danish state, but eventually sold it to the United States in 1944, during the German occupation of Denmark.

The company was a pioneer in development of large, commercial motorships with President Andersen placing an order with Burmeister & Wain, headed by the engineer and diesel marine engine pioneer, Ivar Knudsen, for two motorships,  and MS Fionia, to be built by that firm. Selandia began operation in 1912 after maiden voyage with the Danish crown prince and princess aboard followed by a visit to London where the ship created great interest with visits by Winston Churchill, admirals and influential shipping figures who then remained aboard for a voyage to Antwerp. A third contracted ship, was built in Scotland by Barclay, Curle & Company and became the second large motorship in commercial service with any company. By 1935 the company was operating twenty-seven motorships, including a new .

In these middle years, business grew considerably.  The United Baltic Corporation was formed as a partnership with Andrew Weir & Co. in 1919. The early 1920s saw services extend from Copenhagen to South Africa, Cuba, Australia, Mexico and North Pacific ports.  New York and, later, Philadelphia, Baltimore or Norfolk, Virginia were among the ports of call added for ships on the north Pacific route in 1940.  Connections between Vancouver and the far east were handled by Johnson Walton Steamships Ltd of Vancouver, when they were acquired in 1949.

Most recently, cargo was the mainstay of the business.  As air travel became more popular in later years, passenger operations shrank until 1969, when they were discontinued.

In April 2015, the company rebranded itself as the Santa Fe Group, and changed its listing on the Copenhagen Stock Exchange to the ticker reference SFG. From 2016 to 2019, the group's share lost 94% of its value, and its revenue shrunk 23% year-on-year. In September 2019, the Santa Fe Group was sold to Proventus Capital Partners for 1 million euros after it failed to regain a financial health. Technically, the ownership of the Santa Fe Group was transferred to Santa Fe Intressenter, a company controlled by Lazarus Equity Partners and backed by Proventus. Its Australian subsidiary had already been sold in a management buyout in December 2018. In November 2019, the Santa Fe Group became EAC Invest.

References

Bibliography

The Ships List

External links 
Company website

Conglomerate companies of Denmark
Defunct shipping companies
Transatlantic shipping companies
Danish companies established in 1897